The Air Force Medical Support Agency (AFMSA) provides comprehensive consultative support and policy development for the Air Force Surgeon General in medical force management. It also provides operational support for ground and air expeditionary medical capabilities used in global, homeland security and force health protection as well as all aspects of medical and dental services, aerospace medicine operations, and medical support functions. Additionally, the AFMSA executes policy and programs for modernizing medical capabilities to address critical challenges for operational and peacetime health care and for the joint warfighter through technological solutions. The agency ensures strategic initiatives are fully supported through the planning, programming, budget, execution system and the execution of the budget to fully support global medical capability and national security strategies.

AFMSA was inactivated on June 28, 2019 alongside the Air Force Medical Operations Agency, and their functions were consolidated into the new Air Force Medical Readiness Agency.

References

Notes

Bibliography

 Air Force Historical Research Agency AFMSA Page

See also

Medical Support Agency
Military in Washington, D.C.